Madrugada is a 1974 album released by Melanie featuring the singles "Lover's Cross" and "Love to Lose Again". In November 1973, "Will You Love Me Tomorrow" became a Top 40 hit in the United Kingdom and was subsequently added to the British release of the album.

As with Gather Me, the album featured arrangements and conduction by Roger Kellaway.

The word madrugada is Portuguese and Spanish for the time of day between midnight and sunrise.

Track listing

All songs written by Melanie Safka except where noted:

"Love to Lose Again"
"Lover's Cross" (Jim Croce)
"Pretty Boy Floyd" (Woody Guthrie)
"Wild Horses" (Mick Jagger, Keith Richards)
"I Think It's Going to Rain Today" (Randy Newman)
"Maybe Not For a Lifetime"
"Holding Out"
"I Am Being Guided"
"The Actress"
"Pine and Feather"

U.K. version

"Love to Lose Again"
"Lover's Cross" (Jim Croce)
"Pretty Boy Floyd" (Woody Guthrie)
"Wild Horses" (Mick Jagger, Keith Richards)
"I Think It's Going to Rain Today" (Randy Newman)
"Will You Love Me Tomorrow" (Gerry Goffin, Carole King)
"Maybe Not For a Lifetime"
"Holding Out"
"The Actress"
"Pine and Feather"

Personnel
Melanie - guitar, vocals
Sal DiTroia - acoustic guitar, steel guitar
Hugh McCracken - electric guitar, steel guitar
Joe Macho, Don Payne - bass
Allan Schwartzberg, Denny Seiwell - drums
George Devens, Rick Marotta - percussion
Chuck Domanico - acoustic bass on "The Actress"
Roger Kellaway, Ron Frangipane - arrangements
Technical
Artie Kaplan - contractor
Brooks Arthur - engineer
Larry Alexander - assistant engineer
Pacific Eye & Ear - cover design

Charts

Singles

References 

1974 albums
Melanie (singer) albums